The table below lists the judgments of the Constitutional Court of South Africa delivered in 1998.

The members of the court at the start of 1998 were President Arthur Chaskalson, Deputy President Pius Langa, and judges Lourens Ackermann, John Didcott, Richard Goldstone, Johann Kriegler, Tholie Madala, Yvonne Mokgoro, Kate O'Regan and Albie Sachs. The seat left vacant by the departure at the end of 1996 of Ismail Mahomed to head the Supreme Court of Appeal was filled in February by the appointment of Zak Yacoob. Justice Didcott died in October, and his seat was not filled until 1999.

References
 
 

1998
Constitutional Court
Constitutional Court of South Africa